Robert Abel and Associates (RA&A) was an American pioneering production company specializing in television commercials made with computer graphics. Robert Abel's company, RA&A was especially known for their art direction and won many Clio Awards.

Abel and his team created some of the most advanced and impressive computer-animated works of their time, including full ray-traced renders and fluid character animation at a time when such things were largely unknown. A variety of high-profile television advertisements, graphics sequences for motion pictures (including The Andromeda Strain and Tron), and work on laserdisc video games such as Cube Quest, put Abel and his team on the map in the early 1980s. The company was also originally commissioned to create the visual effects for Star Trek: The Motion Picture, but were subsequently taken off the project for mishandling funds.

Many people who worked at RA&A went on to other ground-breaking projects, including the founding of Wavefront Technologies, Rhythm & Hues and other studios. Many RA&A people went on to win Academy Awards.

RA&A was on the southwest corner of Highland Avenue and Romaine in the heart of Hollywood, California. The company was also notable on its work for The Jacksons' 1981 music video "Can You Feel It."

RA&A closed in 1987 following an ill-fated merger with now-defunct Omnibus Computer Graphics, Inc., a company which had been based in Toronto.

References

External links
The Bob Abel Project
Rob Abel info at OSU
A demo reel of work from 1982

American animation studios
Visual effects companies
Digital media
Film production companies of the United States
Companies based in Los Angeles